Chalán is a town and municipality located in the Sucre Department, northern Colombia.

References
 Gobernacion de Sucre - Chalán
 Chalán official website

Sucre